Feštetić may refer to:

People
 Feštetić family, a Croatian and Hungarian noble family originating in Croatia
 Tomo Feštetić (14th century), Croatian nobleman
 Petar Feštetić (born c. 1480), Croatian nobleman
 Imre Festetics (1764–1847), a Hungarian nobleman and geneticist
 Leo Festetics (1800–1884), Hungarian composer
 György Festetics (1815–1883), Hungarian politician
 Marie Festetics (1839–1923), Austro-Hungarian countess
 Andor Festetics (1843–1930), Austro-Hungarian politician
 Tasziló Festetics (1850–1933), Austro-Hungarian nobleman and politician
 Count Sándor Festetics (1882–1956), Hungarian politician
 Antal Festetics (born 1937), Austrian biologist

Places
 Feštetić Castle, a castle in Pribislavec, a village at Čakovec, northern Croatia
 Festetics Palace, a Baroque palace located in Keszthely, Zala, Hungary
 Feštetics Castle (Dég), a castle in Dég, Fejér county, Hungary
 Festetics Palace (Budapest), a palace located in Budapest, Hungary
 Festetics Palace (Vienna), a palace located in Vienna, Austria

Other uses 
 Festetics String Quartet, a musical ensemble from Budapest, Hungary